Oenoe is a genus of moths belonging to the family Tineidae.

Species
Oenoe eupasta Turner, 1933 – found in Queensland, Australia
Oenoe euphrantis Meyrick, 1927 – Bermuda
Oenoe hemiphara Meyrick, 1893 – New South Wales, Australia
Oenoe hybromella Chambers, 1874 – Kentucky, United States
Oenoe minimella Forbes, 1930 – Virgin Islands
Oenoe ocymorpha Meyrick, 1893 – New South Wales, Australia
Oenoe pumiliella Walsingham, 1897 – West Indies
Oenoe synchorda Meyrick, 1919 – Guyana
Oenoe drosoptila Meyrick, 1924 – Fiji

References

Meessiinae
Moth genera